The Col Ferret (or Grand Col Ferret) is an Alpine pass between the canton of Valais and the Aosta Valley. It is crossed by the route of the Tour du Mont Blanc.

References

See also
 List of mountain passes

Mountain passes of Valais
Mountain passes of Aosta Valley
Mountain passes of the Alps
Italy–Switzerland border crossings